The UCI Track Cycling World Championships – Women's 500 m time trial is the women's world championship 500 m Time Trial event held annually at the UCI Track Cycling World Championships.

Félicia Ballanger of France, and Natalya Tsylinskaya (née Markovnichenko) of Belarus, are the most successful riders in the history of the event with five titles each. Anna Meares of Australia, with nine medals (as of 2015) including four golds is the most decorated time trialist in the history of the event.

Medalists

Medal table

External links
Track Cycling World Championships 2016–1893 bikecult.com
World Championship, Track, 500 m time trial, Elite cyclingarchives.com

 
Women's 500 m time trial
Lists of UCI Track Cycling World Championships medalists